The moose eelpout (Barbapellis pterygalces) is a species of zoarcid fish found in Southern Ocean. This species is only known from a single adult female specimen from off Terre Adélie. This species is the only known member of its genus.

References

Gymnelinae
Fish described in 2012